The Elizalde Tigre IV, also known as the ENMA Tigre IV, is a Spanish four-cylinder inverted air-cooled engine designed and built by Elizalde SA shortly after the Spanish Civil War.

Variants / Designations
Tigre IVA   version.
Tigre IVB   version.
Tigre G-IV A IVA / G-4 (L)-00-125
Tigre G-IV A2 IVA / G-4 (L)-00-125
Tigre G-IV A5
Tigre G-IV B IVB / G-4 (L)-00-150
Tigre G-IV B5
Tigre G-4 (L)-00-125 IVA /  G-IV A
Tigre G-4 (L)-00-150 IVB /  G-IV B

Applications
 CASA 1.131
 Dornier Do 25
AISA I-115
INTA HM.1

Survivors
Approximately 30 ENMA Tigre IV engines remain airworthy in Britain (as of July 2009), all powering CASA 1.131 aircraft which are Spanish licensed-built versions of the Bücker Jungmann.

Approximately 30 Tigre G-IV B engines are under restoration by the company Air Res Aviation located in Poland. The engines will be mainly intended for Bu-131 Jungmann's airplanes restored by Air Res Aviation.

Specifications (Tigre IVA)

Data from: Janes

See also

References

Notes

Bibliography

External links

Air-cooled aircraft piston engines
1940s aircraft piston engines
Inverted aircraft piston engines